Parastou Forouhar (born 1962 in Tehran) is an Iranian installation artist who lives and works out of Frankfurt, Germany. Forouhar's art reflects her criticism of the Iranian government and often plays with the ideas of identity. Her artwork expresses a critical response towards the politics in Iran and Islamic Fundamentalism. The loss of her parents, Dariush and Parvaneh, fuels Forouhar's work and challenges viewers to take a stand on war crimes against innocent citizens. Forouhar's work has been exhibited around the world including Iran, Germany, Russia, Turkey, England, United States, and more.

Biography

Early life and education
The daughter of political activist Parvaneh Forouhar (née Eskandari) and politician Dariush Forouhar, Parastou was born in 1962 in Tehran, Iran. Her father critiqued the Iranian government and he founded and led the Hezb-e-Mellat-e Iran (Nation Party of Iran), which was a far-right secular opposition party in Iran. Her parents were stabbed to death in their home on November 22 of 1998 by a secret operation of Iranian Intelligence service, which is widely known as the Chain Murder. This led Parastou Forouhar to dedicate her life to revealing the atrocities of the Iranian state through her expressive art. Despite it now being more than 20 years since the incident, the state intelligence still impedes her from holding a public commemoration for her parents. She has been threatened by the intelligence service several times and was finally sentenced to six years of conditional prison in 2017. Parastou lives in exile in Germany, and her work has been widely displayed inside and outside of Iran. Parastou studied art at the University of Tehran from 1984 until 1990, where she earned her B.A., she then continued to study at the Hochschule für Gestaltung (High School for Design) in Offenbach am Main in Germany and went on to earn her M.A. in 1994. Parastou lives with her two children in Frankfurt Germany now.

Work 
Forouhar's work is autobiographical in nature and responds to the politics that have shaped and defined contemporary Iranian citizenship both in Iran and abroad. She works within a range of media including site specific installation, animation, digital drawing, photography, signs and products. Through her work, she processes very real experiences of loss, pain, and state-sanctioned violence through animations, wallpapers, flipbooks, and drawings. Forouhar uses culturally specific motifs found within traditional Iranian arts such as Islamic calligraphy and Persian miniature painting to question the ways these forms can generate a lack of individual agency while adhering to a standardized understanding of beauty and cultural identity.

The underlying meaning of her works are not visible at first. They look poetic, lines are smooth, blank colors are like the illustration of the books. At first glance, they are pleasant images seeming embellished with details of line marks and vivid colors. However, as one takes time with them and pays attention to the details, they find out the reality of what they are implying. One of her pieces Kahrizak Prison literally refers to an incident that happened in 2009 where a few of the protesters of the Iranian Green Movement were brought to the Kahrizak detention center and for a few months were harshly tortured and raped resulting in at least five deaths. This series of Parastou's work was created in 2009 pointing out the cruel moments of the day. The form of butterfly is referring to her mother's name, Parvaneh which means butterfly but it is not just about her; she references her mother as an example or a starting point and further expands it to a larger oppressed population; the work signifies a totality while it is focused on a specific incident. It also reminds of the butterflies installed in a butterfly collection where the butterflies had been murdered and their freedom of existence had been taken just to serve somebody's desire.

In 2002, the Iranian Cultural Ministry censored Forouhar's photo exhibition, Blind Spot, a collection of images depicting a veiled, gender-neutral figure with a bulbous, featureless face. Forouhar chose to exhibit the empty frames on the wall on opening night instead of forgoing the show.

Forouhar and her brother got involved in activism after their parents were murdered and they weren't allowed to publicly speak about the deaths. Her artwork critiques the Iranian government and focuses on examining her identity and culture.

In 2012 she received the Sophie von La Roche Award in recognition for her work that confronts issues concerning displacement, gender and cultural identity.

Solo exhibitions of Forouhar's work have been held at Stavanger Cultural Center, Norway; Golestan Art Gallery, Tehran; Hamburger Bahnhof - Museum fur Gegenwart, Berlin; City Museum, Crailsheim, Germany; and German Cathedral, Berlin.

She has participated in group exhibitions at Framer Framed, Amsterdam, Schim Kunsthalle, Frankfurt; Frauenmuseum Bonn; Museum of Modern Art, Frankfurt; Neue Galerie am Landesmuseum, Joanneum, Graz, Austria; House of World Cultures, Berlin; Deutsches Hygiene-Museum, Dresden; Jewish Museum of Australia, Melbourne; Law Warschaw Gallery at Macalester College, Saint Paul; and Jewish Museum San Francisco.

Her work can be found in the following permanent collections: The Queensland Art Museum, Queensland; Belvedere, Vienna; Badisches Landesmuseum, Karlsruhe; Museum of Modern Art, Frankfurt; and the Deutsche Bank Art Collection.

Forouhar has been featured in several art fairs including the Brodsky Center Fair, at Rutgers University in 2015, and Pi Artworks fair Istanbul/London, in 2016 and 2017 (she was at both locations: in Contemporary Istanbul and London).

References

External links 
Omid Memarian, 'Creating Suspension Between Contradictory States: An interview with artist Parastou Forouhar', Global Voices, December 10, 2019.

External links 
 Art21 video interview with Parvaneh Forouhar
 Parastou Forouhar art collection at the Queensland Art Gallery of Modern Art (QAGOMA)

1962 births
Living people
20th-century Iranian women artists
21st-century Iranian women artists
Feminist artists
People from Tehran
Iranian installation artists
Iranian activists
Iranian women photographers
Iranian photographers